The Cimetière du Château in Nice, France, stands on the old citadel of Nice. Today, some sections of the massive walls of the ancient fortress remain. The fortress, which was built in the 16th century, was once one of the most secure strongholds in France. The cemetery itself was founded in 1783 and has 2,800 graves. It is as much popular for its function and history as for the scenic views of the city that affords.

Notable burials

 Freda Betti (1924–1979), opera singer
 Robert Borwick, 1st Baron Borwick (1845–1936)
 Alfred Van Cleef, jeweller
 Louis Feuillade (1873–1925), film director
 Alexander Herzen (1812–1870), writer, novelist
 Gaston Leroux (1868–1927), journalist, novelist
 Emil Jellinek-Mercedes (1853–1918)
 Carolina Otero (1868–1965), dancer
 Renée Saint-Cyr (1904–2004), actress
 Léon Gambetta (1838–1882), French statesman 
 José Gustavo Guerrero (1857–1958), first president of the International Court of Justice
 Agathe-Sophie Sasserno (1810–1860), French poet

References

External links
 

Chateau
Buildings and structures in Nice
Tourist attractions in Nice